Giovanni Battista Rizza (7 February 1924 – 15 October 2018), officially known as Giambattista Rizza, was an Italian mathematician, working in the fields of complex analysis of several variables and in differential geometry: he is known for his contribution to hypercomplex analysis, notably for extending Cauchy's integral theorem and Cauchy's integral formula to complex functions of a hypercomplex variable, the theory of pluriharmonic functions and for the introduction of the now called Rizza manifolds.

Biography

Life and academic career
Born in Piazza Armerina, the son of Giovanni and Angioletta Bocciarelli, he graduated from the Università degli Studi di Genova, earning his laurea degree in 1949 under the direction of Enzo Martinelli. In 1956 he was in Rome at the INdAM, having been awarded a scholarship for his early research activities. A year later, in 1957, he was elected "discepolo ricercatore" in the same institute. During the same year, he gave some lectures on topics belonging to the field of several complex variables, later included in the lecture notes . In Rome he also met Lucilla Bassotti, who eventually become his wife. In 1961, he won the competitive examination for the chair of "Geometria analitica con elementi di Geometria Proiettiva e Geometria Descrittiva con Disegno" of the University of Parma, scoring first out of the three finalists: a year later, in 1962, he became extraordinary professor, and then, in 1965, ordinary professor to the same chair. In 1979 he became ordinary professor of "Geometria superiore", holding that chair uninterruptedly until 1994: from 1994 up to his retirement in 1997, he was "professore fuori ruolo" in the same department of mathematics where he worked for more than 35 years.

Apart from his research and teaching work, he was actively involved as a member of the editorial board of the "Rivista di Matematica della Università di Parma", and served also as the journal director from 1992 to 1997.

Rizza died in Parma on 15 October 2018, at the age of 94.

Honors
In 1954 he was awarded the Ottorino Pomini prize by the Unione Matematica Italiana, jointly with Gabriele Darbo: the judging commission was composed by Giovanni Sansone (as the president), Alessandro Terracini, Beniamino Segre, Giuseppe Scorza-Dragoni, Carlo Miranda, Mario Villa and Enzo Martinelli (as the secretary).

In 1973 he was awarded the golden medal "Benemeriti della Scuola, della Cultura, dell'Arte" by the President of the Italian Republic, as an acknowledgement his research and teaching and achievements as civil servant at the University of Parma.

In 1995, to celebrate his 70th birthday, an international conference on differential geometry was organized in Parma: the proceedings were later published as a special issue of the "Rivista di Matematica della Università di Parma".
In 1999 the University of Parma, where he worked for more than 35 years, awarded him the title of professor emeritus.

Rizza was an honorary member of the Balkan Society of Geometers and life member of the Tensor Society.

Personality traits
Enzo Martinelli described Giovanni Battista Rizza as a passionate researcher with a "strong intellectual force", and his scientific work as rich of geometrical ideas, denoting his strong algorithmic ability.

Work

Research activity
Giovanni Battista Rizza authored 53 research papers and 30 other scientific works, including research announcements, short notes, surveys and reports: he also wrote didactic notes and papers on historical topics, including commemorations of other scientists. His main fields of research were the theory of functions on algebras, the theory of functions of several complex variables, and differential geometry.

Theory of functions on algebras
The theory of functions on algebras, also referred to as hypercomplex analysis, is the study of functions whose domain is a subset of an algebra. The first works of Giovanni Battista Rizza belong to this field of research, and he was awarded the Premio Ottorino Pomini for his contributions.

His first main result is the extension of Cauchy's integral theorem to every monogenic function  on a general complex algebra ,

where  is a 1-dimensional cycle homologous to zero, and also satisfying other technical conditions.

Few years later, he extended Cauchy's integral formula to every monogenic function  on a commutative normed real algebra , isomorphic to a given complex algebra : precisely, he proves the formula

where
 identifies indifferently a point in the complex algebra  or in its isomorphic real algebra ,
 is again a 1-dimensional cycle homologous to zero, and satisfying other technical conditions,
 is the winding number of the cycle  respect to the zero divisor locus for the considered algebra.

Theory of analytic functions of several complex variables

Rizza published only three work in this field: in the first one, the highly remarkable memoir , he extends to pluriharmonic functions of  real variables, the methods introduced by Enzo Martinelli in order to give new proof of a result of Luigi Amoroso for pluriharmonic functions of four real variables. Precisely, he proves the following formula

where
 is a polyharmonic function defined on a bounded domain ,

 is a linear combination of the Levi forms of  relative to couples of complex variables,
Formula  express a condition the normal derivative of the boundary value of a pluriharmonic function on domain with real analytic boundary must satisfy. It can be used to construct an integral representation for pluriharmonic functions on such kind of domains, by using the Green's formula for the Laplacian, and also to establish an integro-differential equation boundary values of pluriharmonic functions must satisfy. Rizza's result motivated other works on the same topic by Gaetano Fichera, Paolo de Bartolomeis and Giuseppe Tomassini.

Selected publications

Research works
. In this work Rizza extends the classical Cauchy's integral theorem to monogenic functions on a general complex algebra.
.
.
.
.
, available at DigiZeitschirften.
. This paper is also interesting since it traces the story of such extensions back to the pioneering work of Eugenio Elia Levi.
. The notes from the lectures given by Giovanni Battista Rizza for a course held by Francesco Severi at the Istituto Nazionale di Alta Matematica: the full course notes, published as a monograph, include also a chapter by Enzo Martinelli and an appendix by Mario Benedicty). The topics he exposes are summarized by the two parts of the title, whose free English translations are "Explicit integral representation for –harmonic functions" and "Extension of the E. E. Levi invariant to the case of  complex variables".
.
.
.
. Shoshichi Kobayashi cites this article as the first one in the theory of Rizza manifolds.
.
. 
. In this work the authors introduce a new class of functions on a real algebra in the attempt of unifying the research trends on functions on real algebras in the seventies.

Historical, commemorative and survey papers
. A short but comprehensive survey paper detailing the works on the field done by Italian mathematicians during the years from 1961 to 1973: however, it also includes several biographical references to other earlier works by non Italian mathematicians and to historical bibliographies on hypercomplex analysis.
. The brief "participating address" presented to the International congress on the occasion of the celebration of the centenary of birth of Mauro Picone and Leonida Tonelli (held in Rome on May 6–9, 1985), by Giovanni Battista Rizza on behalf of the University of Parma: the scientific relations between Leonida Tonelli and the Department of Mathematics in Parma are described. 
. A celebrative paper written by Giovanni Battista Rizza to honor his former master.
.
.
.

See also
Almost complex manifold
Complex manifold
Kähler manifold
Pluriharmonic function
Pseudoconvexity
Rizza manifold
Several complex variables

References

Sources

Biographical
.
. The official relation of the judging commission for the awarding of the Ottorino Pomini Prize in 1954, jointly won by Gabriele Darbo and Giovanni Battista Rizza.
. The official announcement of the winning by Giovanni Battista Rizza of the chair of "Geometria analitica con elementi di Geometria Proiettiva e Geometria Descrittiva con Disegno" awarded by the University of Parma.
.
.
.
. "Homage to Giovanni Battista Rizza on his 70th birthday" (English translation of the title) a tribute to Giovanni Battista Rizza by his former master Enzo Martinelli.
. The "Ministerial Decree" awarding the title of "Professor Emeritus" to Giovanni Battista Rizza.
.
.
.
. "Materials toward a history of the Istituto Nazionale di Alta Matematica from 1939 to 2003" (English translation of title) is a monographic fascicle published on the "Bollettino della Unione Matematica Italiana", describing the history of the Istituto Nazionale di Alta Matematica Francesco Severi from its foundation in 1939 to 2003. It was written by Gino Roghi and includes a presentation by Salvatore Coen and a preface by Corrado De Concini. It is almost exclusively based on sources from the institute archives: the wealth and variety of materials included, jointly with its appendices and indexes, make this monograph a useful reference not only for the history of the institute itself, but also for the history of many mathematicians who taught, followed the institute courses or simply worked there.
. The official 1973 CV of Giovanni Battista Rizza, available from the Institute of Mathematics of the University of Parma.
.
. The opening address on the occasion of the beginning of the academic year 1962/63, given by the Magnifico Rettore prof. G. Venturini.

Scientific

.
.
. The proceedings of a international meeting celebrating Giovanni Battista Rizza, published by the Rivista di Matematica della Università di Parma. The first speaker was his former master Enzo Martinelli.
. "Boundary value problems for pluriharmonic functions" (English translation of the title) deals with boundary value problems for pluriharmonic functions: Fichera gives a trace condition for the solvability of the problem and extensively reviews its history, starting from its beginning in the work of Henri Poincare and analyzing several earlier results of Enzo Martinelli, Giovanni Battista Rizza and Francesco Severi, as well as works of Aldo Andreotti among the others.
.
.
.
. In this paper, Shoshichi Kobayashi acknowledges Giovanni Battista Rizza as the first one to study complex manifolds with Finsler structure, now called Rizza manifolds.
. In this work Martinelli proves an earlier result of Luigi Amoroso on the boundary values of pluriharmonic function by using tensor calculus.
.
. A set of lecture notes from a course held by Francesco Severi at the Istituto Nazionale di Alta Matematica, including appendices of Enzo Martinelli, Giovanni Battista Rizza and Mario Benedicty.

1924 births
2018 deaths
20th-century Italian mathematicians
21st-century  Italian  mathematicians
Complex analysts
Differential geometers
Mathematical analysts
University of Genoa alumni
Academic staff of the University of Parma
People from Piazza Armerina
Mathematicians from Sicily